Lien-Ju Anne Chao is a Taiwanese environmental statistician. She works in the Institute of Statistics at National Tsing Hua University, where she is Tsing Hua Distinguished Chair Professor and a former Taiwan National Chair Professor. Chao has described herself as "60% statistician, 30% mathematician and 10% ecologist". She is known for her work on mark and recapture methods for estimating the size and diversity of populations. She has authored or co-authored a number of software tools for quantifying and estimating biological diversity, and her scholarly works have been cited more than 23,000 times as of November 2019.

Chao earned a bachelor's degree in mathematics at National Tsing Hua University in 1973. She moved to the U.S. for graduate study, completing a Ph.D. in statistics at the University of Wisconsin–Madison in 1977. Her dissertation, supervised by Bernard Harris, was The Quadrature Method in Inference Problems Arising From the Generalized Multinomial Distribution.
After working for a year as a visiting assistant professor at the University of Michigan, she returned to National Tsing Hua University as a faculty member in 1978. She was Taiwan National Chair Professor there from 2005 to 2008, and became Tsing Hua Distinguished Chair Professor in 2006.

With Lou Jost, Chao is the author of Diversity Analysis (Taylor & Francis, 2008; Chapman & Hall, 2017). She is also the author with of Statistical Estimation of Biodiversity Indices (Wiley, 2017) with Chun-Huo Chiu and Jost.

Chao was elected as a fellow of the Institute of Mathematical Statistics in 1997.
She is also an elected member of the International Statistical Institute.

References

External links

Anne Chao's academic website

Year of birth missing (living people)
Place of birth missing (living people)
Living people
Taiwanese statisticians
Women statisticians
National Tsing Hua University alumni
University of Wisconsin–Madison alumni
University of Michigan faculty
Academic staff of the National Tsing Hua University
Elected Members of the International Statistical Institute
Fellows of the Institute of Mathematical Statistics